The 1932–33 Lancashire Cup was the twenty-fifth occasion on which the Lancashire Cup completion had been held. Warrington won the trophy by beating St. Helens by 10–9 in the final.

Competition and results 

The number of teams entering this year's competition remained at 13 and the same fixture format was retained. There was only one bye in the first round but now also a “blank” or “dummy” fixture. This also resulted in one bye in the second round.

Round 1 
Involved 6 matches (with one bye and one “blank” fixture) and 13 clubs

Round 1 – replays 
Involved 2 matches

Round 1 – Second replays 
Involved 1 match

Round 1 – Third replays 
Involved 1 match

Round 2 – quarterfinals 
Involved 3 matches (with one bye) and 7 clubs

Round 3 – semifinals 
Involved 2 matches and 4 clubs

Round 3 – semifinals – replays 
Involved 1 match

Final 

The final was played at Central Park, Wigan, (historically in the county of Lancashire). The attendance was 28,500 and receipts £1,675. The attendance was again a new record - beating last year's total of 26,471.

Teams and scorers 

Scoring - Try = three (3) points - Goal = two (2) points - Drop goal = two (2) points

The road to success

Notes and comments 

1 * Match abandoned after 40 minutes

2 * The attendance of 28,500 was a new record for a Lancashire Cup final attendance

3 * Central Park was the home ground of Wigan with a final capacity of 18,000, although the record attendance was 47,747 for Wigan v St Helens 27 March 1959

See also 
1932–33 Northern Rugby Football League season
Rugby league county cups

References

External links
Saints Heritage Society
1896–97 Northern Rugby Football Union season at wigan.rlfans.com
Hull&Proud Fixtures & Results 1896/1897
Widnes Vikings - One team, one passion Season In Review - 1896-97
The Northern Union at warringtonwolves.org
 

RFL Lancashire Cup
Lancashire Cup